The following list of waterfalls of Canada include all waterfalls of superlative significance.

Tallest waterfalls

By overall height
, there are 18 confirmed waterfalls with an overall height of at least .

By tallest single drop
, there are 14 confirmed waterfalls to have a single unbroken drop with a height of at least .

Waterfalls by average flow rate

, there are 25 confirmed waterfalls with an average flow rate or discharge of at least .

Notable waterfalls by province

Alberta

British Columbia

Manitoba

New Brunswick

Newfoundland & Labrador

Northwest Territories

Nova Scotia

Nunavut

Ontario

Quebec

Saskatchewan

Yukon

See also
List of waterfalls

Notes

References

External links

Waterfalls
Waterfalls